Kamen Del ( / ‘Stone Piece’) is a peak on Vitosha Mountain in Bulgaria. Its northern slope is partly covered by an extensive one by one km stone sea. A flat col links Kamen Del to Ushite Peak  to the south, hosting a small refuge on the track between Aleko and Zlatnite Mostove, the two most popular tourist sites on Vitosha.

See also

 Ushite Peak
 Vitosha

External links
 Image Gallery of Peak Kamen Del

References
 Vitosha
 Vitosha Nature Park. Website.
 Vitosha Map.

Vitosha
Mountains of Bulgaria
Landforms of Sofia City Province